Anne-Marie Ekström (born 1947) is a Swedish Liberal People's Party politician. She was a member of the Riksdag from 2002 to 2006.

External links
Anne-Marie Ekström at the Riksdag website

1947 births
Living people
Members of the Riksdag from the Liberals (Sweden)
Women members of the Riksdag
Members of the Riksdag 2002–2006
21st-century Swedish women politicians